is a railway station in the town of Fukaura, Aomori Prefecture, Japan, operated by the East Japan Railway Company (JR East).

Lines

Station layout
Ōmagoshi  Station has one ground-level side platform serving a single bi-directional track. The station is unattended and is managed from Fukaura Station.

History
Ōmagoshi Station was opened on December 26, 1930, as a station on the Japanese Government Railways (JGR). With the privatization of the Japanese National Railways (the successor to the JGR) on April 1, 1987, it came under the operational control of JR East.

Surrounding area

Shirakami-Sanchi

See also
 List of Railway Stations in Japan

References

External links

  

Stations of East Japan Railway Company
Railway stations in Aomori Prefecture
Gonō Line
Fukaura, Aomori
Railway stations in Japan opened in 1930